Coast Guard LORAN-C Station Estartit was the Zulu secondary station of the Mediterrean Sea LORAN-C Chain ( GRI 7990). 
It used a transmission power of 165 kW.
Estartit LORAN-C transmitter used as antenna a 190.5 metre ( 625 ft) tall mast radiator.

The transmitters were demolished in 2005.

External links
 http://www.megapulse.com/chaininfo.html

LORAN-C transmitters
Towers in Catalonia
Buildings and structures demolished in 2005
2005 disestablishments in Spain